Ectypia mexicana is a moth of the family Erebidae. It was described by Paul Dognin in 1911. It is found in Mexico and southern Texas.

References

Phaegopterina
Moths described in 1911